| tries ={{#expr: 
 + 2 + 8 + 5
 + 5 + 4 + 4
 + 3 + 5 + 3
}}
| top point scorer    = Dorin Manole (Romania)(30 points)
| top try scorer      = Andrea Bacchetti (Italy A)Alberto Chiesa (Italy A)(3 tries)
| venue               = 
| attendance2         = 
| champions           = 
| count               = 1
| runner-up           = 
| website             = IRB Nations Cup
| previous year       = 2011
| previous tournament = 2011 IRB Nations Cup
| next year           = 2013
| next tournament     = 2013 IRB Nations Cup
}}

The 2012 IRB Nations Cup was the seventh edition of the international rugby union tournament, a competition created by the International Rugby Board.  It pitted the "A" Teams of the stronger rugby nations (Tier 1, Argentina Jaguars and Italy A) against the Tier 2 (Romania) and Tier 3 (Portugal and Russia) nations. And Uruguay played against Romania, Russia and Portugal.

For the sixth consecutive year the event was held in Bucharest, Romania.  South African Kings did not return to defend their title.  For the first time in the competition's history, host nation Romania won.

The competition format was a modified round-robin whereby there three ENC teams (Romania, Russia and Portugal) played the other three teams (Argentina XV, Italy A and Uruguay).  The competition was played over three match days, with three matches played consecutively on each day.

Standings

Fixtures

Matchday 1
IRB Reports

Matchday 2
IRB Reports

Matchday 3
IRB Reports

Top scorers

Top points scorers

Source: irb.com

Top try scorers

Source: irb.com

See also 

2012 IRB Pacific Nations Cup

References

External links
Fixtures/Results
Standings

2012
2012 rugby union tournaments for national teams
International rugby union competitions hosted by Romania
2011–12 in Romanian rugby union
2011–12 in Italian rugby union
2012 in Argentine rugby union
2012 in Russian rugby union
rugby union
rugby union
Sport in Bucharest